National Creek Falls is a waterfall from National Creek, that plunges into a grotto surrounded by a meadow of mosses on the west skirt of the Crater Lake National Park, north of Union Creek, Oregon.

History 
National Creek Falls lays adjacent to Diamond Lake Road off US Route 62. The road was once a wagon route used for travel from the Rogue Valley to the newly discovered gold mines in the John Day Valley. The drainage of National Creek was then a popular layover site for miners and stock-men travelers that passed at Lake West towards the John Day Valley. After a fire devastated the area in the early 1860s the route was reopened in 1910 by the Forest Service, now known as Diamond Lake Road.

Trail 
National Creek Falls is located on pumice flanks of Mount Mazama with basalt outcropping that diverges the creek into a wide waterfall. The National Creek Falls trail starts off Crater Lake Highway and descends through a shaded, mixed conifer forest, ending at the base of National Creek Falls, totaling .

See also 
 List of waterfalls in Oregon

References

Waterfalls of Douglas County, Oregon
Crater Lake National Park